Dario Alejandro Gasco (born January 20, 1987 in Concepción, Tucumán) is an Argentine professional mountain biker. He won a bronze medal in men's cross-country racing at the 2007 Pan American Games, and later represented his nation Argentina at the 2008 Summer Olympics. Throughout his sporting career, Gasco has been training and riding for four consecutive seasons on Zenith MTB International, and Spain's Massi Cycling Team.

Gasco spotted officially on his major international debut at the 2007 Pan American Games in Rio de Janeiro, Brazil, where he delivered a bronze-medal time of 2:07:37 in the men's cross-country race, trailing behind U.S. rider Adam Craig and Brazil's Rubens Donizete within a two-minute gap.

At the 2008 Summer Olympics in Beijing, Gasco qualified for the Argentine squad in the men's cross-country race by receiving an invitational berth from the Union Cycliste Internationale (UCI), based on his best performance at the World and Pan American Championships. He scored a twenty-seventh place in a 4.8-km sturdy, treacherous cross-country course with a time of 2:07:04.

References

External links

1987 births
Living people
Argentine male cyclists
Cross-country mountain bikers
Cyclists at the 2008 Summer Olympics
Cyclists at the 2007 Pan American Games
Pan American Games bronze medalists for Argentina
Olympic cyclists of Argentina
Sportspeople from Tucumán Province
Pan American Games medalists in cycling
Medalists at the 2007 Pan American Games
21st-century Argentine people